Bess Alice May Heath (born 20 August 2001) is an English cricketer who currently plays for Yorkshire, Northern Diamonds, Northern Superchargers and Melbourne Stars. She plays as a wicket-keeper and right-handed batter. She previously played for Derbyshire, as well as Yorkshire Diamonds in the Women's Cricket Super League.

Early life
Heath was born on 20 August 2001 in Chesterfield, Derbyshire.

Domestic career
Heath made her county debut in 2014, for Derbyshire against Scotland. In 2016, Heath hit her maiden county century, scoring 114 against Norfolk. She was Derbyshire's leading run-scorer in the 2017 and 2018 Twenty20 Cups, as well as in the 2018 Women's County Championship, where she hit 210 runs including her second county century, 108 against Northamptonshire.

In 2021, Heath joined Yorkshire for the Twenty20 Cup. She made her debut in the second round of matches, scoring 52* off 36 deliveries against North East Warriors before rain ended the game prematurely. She played one match for the side in the 2022 Women's Twenty20 Cup, scoring 39.

Heath also played for Yorkshire Diamonds in the Women's Cricket Super League in 2018 and 2019. She played 10 matches across the two seasons, scoring 46 runs with a best of 24 in a victory over Loughborough Lightning in 2018.

In 2020, Heath played for Northern Diamonds in the Rachael Heyhoe Flint Trophy. She appeared in all 7 matches, scoring 37 runs and taking 8 catches. Heath missed the beginning of the 2021 regional season due to injury. She returned to play for Northern Superchargers in The Hundred, making six appearances. She returned to the Northern Diamonds squad to play five matches apiece in the Rachael Heyhoe Flint Trophy and the Charlotte Edwards Cup. She scored 103 runs in the Charlotte Edwards Cup, including 58* from 40 balls to help beat North West Thunder and qualify for Finals Day. She also scored two half-centuries in consecutive games in the Rachael Heyhoe Flint Trophy, 78* against North West Thunder and 71 against Southern Vipers. At the end of the 2021 season, it was announced that Heath had signed a professional contract with Northern Diamonds. She played 12 matches for Northern Diamonds in 2022, across the Charlotte Edwards Cup and the Rachael Heyhoe Flint Trophy, scoring five half-centuries with a top score of 70, against Western Storm. She also scored 44 in the final of the Rachael Heyhoe Flint Trophy, as Diamonds won their first title. She played six matches for Northern Superchargers in The Hundred, and scored one half-century, 57 from 34 deliveries against London Spirit.

In October 2022, Heath signed for Melbourne Stars for the opening matches of the 2022–23 Women's Big Bash League season, as an international replacement player for Jemimah Rodrigues. She played seven matches for the side that season, scoring 128 runs at an average of 21.33 and a high score of 37.

References

External links

2001 births
Living people
Cricketers from Chesterfield, Derbyshire
Derbyshire women cricketers
Yorkshire women cricketers
Yorkshire Diamonds cricketers
Northern Diamonds cricketers
Northern Superchargers cricketers
Melbourne Stars (WBBL) cricketers